The subarachnoid lymphatic-like membrane (SLYM) is an anatomical structure in the human brain that was proposed in 2023 as a possible fourth layer of the meninges.

The SLYM is located in the subarachnoid space, the space between the middle reticular meninges and the innermost tender meninges that lie close to the brain.  It divides the subarachnoid space into an outer, superficial compartment and an inner, deeper area surrounding the brain.

Structure 
The SLYM is reported to be a thin monolayer of cells and contains its own immune cells. The SLYM may inhibit larger molecules, such as peptides and proteins, from passing into the interior of the brain and could thus assume a barrier function.

Discovery and interpretation
SLYM was first reported as a possible novel anatomical structure in the human brain. SLYM is impermeable to any molecule larger than 3000 daltons. It may have an immunological role, in which immune cell numbers change with aging or inflammation.

In February 2023, research groups from Germany, Finland, Switzerland, South Korea and USA submitted comments to the eLetters section of the paper challenging the paper's conclusions for its methodology and conclusions as misinterpreted or by stating the structure was already known.

References 

Brain
Meninges